Paul Coffey (born 13 September 1969) is a British businessman, and the ex Chief Executive of npower.

Early life
From 1993 to 1995 he did an HNC in Business and Finance at the University of Northumbria at Newcastle (became Northumbria University in 2002). From 1995 to 1997 he did a BSc in Business and Finance at the University of Sunderland.

Career
He joined Northern Electric in 1989, working with them for around a decade.

npower
He joined npower in 2002, the same year it was taken over by RWE of Germany. He became Chief Executive of RWE npower in October 2015, where he was ultimately replaced on November 29th 2019 as part of Eon's take over of npower's parent company Innogy.

Personal life
He originates from North East England.

See also
 Tony Cocker, Chief Executive since January 2012 of E.ON UK
 Vincent de Rivaz, Chief Executive since 2003 of EDF Energy
 Peter Terium, Chief Executive since July 2012 of RWE

References

External links
 npower
 RWE

1969 births
Alumni of Northumbria University
Alumni of the University of Sunderland
British chief executives in the energy industry
RWE
Living people